David Emil Mungello (born 1943) is an American historian on the cultural interaction between Europe and China since 1550. He has written on the introduction of Christianity into China and the reception of Confucianism into Europe. He is recognized as one of the leading modern authorities on the Jesuit missions in China. He has also written on the history of queer Western men in China.

Biography 
Mungello received a B.A. in philosophy at George Washington University in 1965, an M.A. in Asian Studies from the University of California, Berkeley in 1969, and a Ph.D. in history from the University of California, Berkeley in 1973. His Ph.D. dissertation was on Leibniz and Confucianism, later published in 1977. He has taught at Lingnan College in Hong Kong, Briarcliff College, Coe College (Iowa), and Baylor University.

Works 
 Leibniz and Confucianism: The Search for Accord (1977)
 .
 The Forgotten Christians of Hangzhou (1994)
 The Great Encounter of China and the West, 1500-1800 (1999)
 .
 Western Queers in China: Flight to the Land of Oz (2012)
 The Chinese Rites Controversy: Its History and Meaning (1994)

References

21st-century American historians
21st-century American male writers
American sinologists
Baylor University faculty
Living people
1943 births
Coe College faculty
University of California, Berkeley alumni
American male non-fiction writers